Gottstein is a surname, meaning "God's rock" in German. Notable people with the surname include: 

Adolf Gottstein (1857–1941), German social hygienist and epidemiologist
Anton Gottstein (1893–1982), Czech cross-country skier
James Gottstein, American lawyer
Thomas Gottstein (born 1964), Swiss banker, CEO of Credit Suisse

Jewish surnames
German-language surnames
Yiddish-language surnames
Surnames from ornamental names
German toponymic surnames